This is a list of entertainers who have performed at the SM Mall of Asia complex in Pasay, Metro Manila, Philippines, either at the Mall of Asia Arena, the Mall of Asia concert grounds, or the SMX Convention Center.

SM Mall of Asia Arena

Mall of Asia concert grounds

SMX Convention Center

See also
 List of entertainment events at the Araneta Center
 List of events held at the Philippine Arena

References

External links
 List of Events – Mall of Asia Arena

Events
Metro Manila-related lists
Events in Metro Manila
Entertainment events in the Philippines
Lists of events by venue